NBD-TMA ([2-(4-nitro-2,1,3-benzoxadiazol-7-yl)aminoethyl]trimethylammonium) is a small, positively charged (+1) fluorescent dye.  It was also known as EAM-1 (N,N,N,-Trimethyl-2[(7-nitro-2,1,3-benzoxadiazol-4-yl)amino]ethanaminium iodide) when it was briefly supplied by Macrocyclics Company as an iodide complex.

NBD-TMA has an excitation maximum at 458 nm and an emission maximum at 530 nm.  It also has a smaller local excitation maximum around 343 nm.  The molar extinction coefficient is about 13,000 cm−1M−1 and its overall effective fluorescence is about 1% that of fluorescein.  It is only mildly sensitive to halide ion collision quenching.

NBD-TMA was designed as a probe for monitoring renal transport of organic cations.  As a small, positively charged fluorophore, it has also seen use as a tracer for measuring gap junction coupling in cases of cation selective connexin channels.

Further reading 
 
 

Fluorescent dyes
Benzoxadiazoles
Ethyleneamines
Nitro compounds
Secondary amines
Quaternary ammonium compounds